The NW type U is an Edwardian era automobile manufactured by Nesselsdorfer Wagenbau-Fabriks-Gesellschaft A.G. (NW, now known as Tatra). After the success of Type S, models NW T (four-cylinder) and NW U (six-cylinder) were launched. Both types were again OHC design with hemispherical combustion chambers with the cylinders cast in one piece with the engine block.

As the company changed its name the model was renamed to Tatra 10  in 1919. The production version was able to reach .

The Type U was fitted with brakes on all four wheels, probably the first production car in the world with such brake system.

References

10
Tatra 10
Tatra 10
Cars of the Czech Republic
Rear-wheel-drive vehicles